Lookin' Back is a studio album by American country singer–songwriter Hank Locklin. It was released in July 1969 via RCA Victor Records and contained 11 tracks. The project was produced by Danny Davis and contained no single releases. Lookin' Back centered around cover songs by country and pop artists of the era. It was Locklin's twentieth studio album release in his career.

Background and content
Hank Locklin had several years of major commercial success with RCA Victor Records with hits like "Geisha Girl," "Please Help Me, I'm Falling" and "Happy Birthday to Me." After one final major hit in 1968, Locklin's success began to wane on the popularity charts. In 1969, he had his final top 40 single, yet continued releasing studio albums on RCA's label. Lookin' Back was an album of covers first recorded by other artists in the country and pop genres. A total of 11 cover songs were included on the record. It featured covers of country hits of the time, such as Jim Reeves' "He'll Have to Go," Jimmy C. Newman's "Cry, Cry, Darling" and Locklin's cover of his original 1953 hit, "Let Me Be the One." Covers of pop songs included Guy Mitchell's "My Heart Cries for You" and the pop standard "When I Grow Too Old to Dream." Lookin' Back was recorded at the RCA Victor Studio in April 1969. It was produced by Danny Davis.

Release and reception

Lookin' Back was released in July 1969 on RCA Victor Records, making it Locklin's twentieth studio album. It was originally distributed as a vinyl LP, containing six songs on "side A" and five songs on "side B." It was eventually re-released to digital markets in the 2010s, such as Apple Music. No singles were spawned from the album. It also did not chart on the Billboard Top Country Albums list, Locklin's first album not to make the list since 1965. Lookin' Back received mixed reviews from writers and critics. Billboard magazine positively commented on it in their 1969 review, calling Locklin "smooth and compelling as ever." Thom Owens of Allmusic gave the album only two stars in his review: "Though Hank Locklin is in fine voice throughout Lookin' Back, the LP is burdened by too many average songs and overblown production that makes the record a frustrating listen."

Track listing

Vinyl version

Digital version

Personnel
All credits are adapted from the liner notes of Lookin' Back.

Musical and technical personnel
 Danny Davis – producer
 The Jordanaires – background vocals
 Hank Locklin – lead vocals
 Bill McElhiney – arrangement
 Tom Pick – engineer
 Roy Shockley – assistant engineer
 Lawton Williams – liner notes

Release history

References

1969 albums
Albums produced by Danny Davis (country musician)
Hank Locklin albums
RCA Victor albums